Nils Nilsson (7 January 1899 – 18 July 1961) was a Swedish wrestler. He competed in the freestyle featherweight event at the 1924 Summer Olympics.

References

External links
 

1899 births
1961 deaths
Olympic wrestlers of Sweden
Wrestlers at the 1924 Summer Olympics
Swedish male sport wrestlers
Sportspeople from Oslo
20th-century Swedish people